Bommanahalli is a locality in Bengaluru and one of the zones of BBMP. It is located adjacent to Hosur Road National Highway 44 (India) in India and is proximate to the IT hub Electronics City.

Two of The Oxford Educational Institutions are located in Bommanahalli, the Oxford College of Engineering and the Oxford Dental
College, Hospital and Research Center.

The joint commissioner of the zone is currently Rama Krishna.

Residents of Bommanahalli tend not to be connected to Bengaluru's water supply network and are dependent on tanker trucks and wells for water.

References

Neighbourhoods in Bangalore